Demetrida loweri is a species of ground beetle in Lebiinae subfamily. It was described by Blackburn in 1890 and is found in Australia.

References

Beetles described in 1890
Beetles of Australia
loweri